The 1976 German Formula Three Championship was a multi-event motor racing championship for single-seat open wheel formula racing cars held across Europe. The championship featured drivers competing in two-litre Formula Three racing cars which conformed to the technical regulations, or formula, for the championship. It commenced on 3 April at Nürburgring and ended at Ulm-Mengen on 13 September after eight rounds.

Bertram Schäfer became a champion. He won all five races that he has participated (Nürburgring, Trier, AVUS, Hockenheim and at Ulm-Mengen. Marc Surer finished as runner-up, winning the race Kassel-Calden. Rudolf Dötsch completed the top-three in the drivers' standings with win at Nürburgring. Werner Klein was the only other driver who was able to win a race in the season.

Calendar
All rounds were held in West Germany.

Championship standings
Points are awarded as follows:

References

External links
 

German Formula Three Championship seasons
Formula Three season